Darke County Airport  is a county-owned, public-use airport in Darke County, Ohio, United States. It is  located two nautical miles (4 km) southwest of the central business district of Versailles. It is along State Route 121 just south of Versailles. Midmark operates a private jet from this airport. The airport is included in the National Plan of Integrated Airport Systems for 2011–2015, which categorized it as a general aviation facility.

Although most U.S. airports use the same three-letter location identifier for the FAA and IATA, this airport is assigned VES by the FAA, but has no designation from the IATA.

Facilities and aircraft 
Darke County Airport covers an area of 42 acres (17 ha) at an elevation of 1,007 feet (307 m) above mean sea level. It has one runway designated 9/27 with an asphalt surface measuring 4,512 by 75 feet (1,375 x 23 m).

For the 12-month period ending July 17, 2012, the airport had 9,238 aircraft operations, an average of 25 per day: 99% general aviation, 1% air taxi, and <1% military.
At that time there were 23 aircraft based at this airport: 91% single-engine, 4% multi-engine, and 4% jet.

References

External links 
 Aerial image as of April 1994 from USGS The National Map
 

Airports in Ohio
Buildings and structures in Darke County, Ohio
Transportation in Darke County, Ohio
1964 establishments in Ohio
Airports established in 1964